Divine Trash is a 1998 documentary film directed by Steve Yeager about the life and work of John Waters.

Cast
Steve Yeager
John Waters
Robert Shaye
Mink Stole
Divine (archive footage)
David Lochary (archive footage)
Edith Massey (archive footage)
Herschell Gordon Lewis
Danny Mills
Mary Vivian Pearce
Vincent Peranio
Paul Swift
John Pierson
Hal Hartley
Steve Buscemi
Jim Jarmusch
Channing Wilroy
Mary Avara
David O. Russell
Paul Morrissey
Jonas Mekas
George Kuchar
Mike Kuchar
Ken Jacobs

References

External links
 
 

1998 films
American documentary films
American independent films
Documentary films about film directors and producers
Documentary films about LGBT film
1998 documentary films
Films shot in Baltimore
LGBT culture in Baltimore
John Waters
1998 independent films
Drag (clothing)-related films
1998 LGBT-related films
1990s English-language films
1990s American films